...Rocks Your Lame Ass is the second studio album by the American rock band Hagfish, released in June 1995 on London Records. The album was recorded and produced by Bill Stevenson and Stephen Egerton at The Blasting Room in Fort Collins, Colorado in 1994. Backed by the singles "Stamp" and "Happiness", which also included music videos that were featured on MTV's 120 Minutes, Rocks Your Lame Ass would go on to become the group's most successful effort. The album rights were later acquired by UMG when they purchased London Records.

Track listing
All songs written by George Stroud Reagan III except where noted.

 "Happiness" – 2:08 
 "Stamp" – 2:19
 "Flat" – 2:09 
 "Bullet" (Reagan, Michael Gardner) – 2:36 
 "Crater" – 1:15 
 "Minit Maid" (Reagan, Zach Blair) – 1:26 
 "White Food" (Z. Blair) – 0:52 
 "Disappointed" (Reagan, Doni Blair) – 2:28 
 "Plain" – 2:25 
 "Buster" – 2:21
 "Trixie" (Reagan, D. Blair) – 2:29
 "Did You Notice" – 2:01 
 "Gertrude" (Reagan, Z. Blair) – 2:22
 "Hose" – 2:30

Personnel
George Stroud Reagan III – lead vocals
Zach Blair – guitar, backing vocals
Doni Blair – bass guitar
Tony Barsotti – drums, backing vocals
Additional personnel
Bill Stevenson – producer, mixer, engineer
Stephen Egerton – producer, mixer, engineer
Howie Weinberg – mastering engineer
Karl Alvarez – backing vocal assistance
Jon Snodgrass – backing vocal assistance
Amos T. Ache – art direction, layout design
Joby Cummings – 'Fighting Hagfish' logo
Marina Chavez – photography

References

Hagfish (band) albums
1995 albums
London Records albums
Albums produced by Bill Stevenson (musician)